Lobato (which means "wolfling" in Spanish and Portuguese) may refer to:

People

 Chano Lobato (1927–2009), Spanish flamenco singer
 Cristian Lobato (born 1989), Spanish footballer
 Edson Lobato, Brazilian scientist, 2006 World Food Prize recipient
 Elvira Lobato, Brazilian journalist
 Gilmar Lobato da Rocha (born 1973), Brazilian footballer
 Josep Lobató (born 1977), Spanish Catalan radio and television presenter
 Juan José Lobato (born 1988), Spanish cyclist
Kirstin Lobato, see Trials of Kirstin Lobato
 Lúcia Lobato (born 1965), East Timorese politician
 Marcelo Lobato, member of Brazilian band O Rappa
 Monteiro Lobato (1882–1948), Brazilian writer
 Nelida Lobato (1934–1982), Argentinian dancer and actress
 Nicolau dos Reis Lobato (1952–1978), East Timorese politician and national hero
 Rita Lobato (1866–1954), first woman to practice medicine in Brazil
 Rogerio Lobato (born 1949), East Timorese politician
 Rosa Lobato de Faria (1932–2010), Portuguese actress and writer
 Rubén Lobato (born 1978), Spanish cyclist
 Tammy Lobato (born 1971), Australian politician

Places
 Lobato, Paraná, a municipality in the state of Paraná, Brazil
 Mathias Lobato, a municipality in the state of Minas Gerais, Brazil
 Gonçalves Lobato Airport, in Viseu, Portugal
 Monteiro Lobato, São Paulo, a municipality in Brazil named after the writer
 Presidente Nicolau Lobato International Airport, in East Timor, named after the politician
 Lobatos, Colorado, a community in the United States

See also
 Lovato (disambiguation)